The 2012 Denbighshire County Council election took place in Denbighshire, Wales, on 3 May 2012 to elect members of Denbighshire Council. This was the same day as other 2012 United Kingdom local elections. The previous elections took place in 2008 and the next all-council elections took place in 2017.

Background
Labour Party and Independent candidates were hoping to take seats from the governing Conservatives. Topical issues included the county's Local Development Plan and redevelopment of Rhyl's seafront, as well as the usual funding pressures and unemployment. Four of the 30 electoral wards were uncontested, while in the Ruthin ward there were 12 candidates competing for the 3 seats.

Results

Overview
The 39.1% turnout was even lower than the turnout in 2008 (42%), despite the weather being sunny.  It was particularly low in areas of social deprivation, such as Rhyl West.

|}

Election error
In the Prestatyn North ward, the incorrect councillor was declared the winner, due to his similar surname. Conservative councillor Allan Pennington became councillor for the ward, after 265 votes for the Labour candidate, Paul Penlington, were allocated to him. Penlington was not able to take his rightful seat until 14 February 2013, after a court case involving three High Court judges.

Ward results

Bodelwyddan (one seat)

Corwen (one seat)

Denbigh Central (one seat)

Denbigh Lower (two seats)

Denbigh Upper/Henllan (two seats)

Dyserth (one seat)

Efenechtyd (one seat)

Llanarmon-Yn-Lal/Llandelga (one seat)

Llanbedr Dyffryn Clwyd (one seat)

Llandrillo (one seat)

Llandyrnog (one seat)

Llanfair Dyffryn Clwyd Gwyddelwern (one seat)

Llangollen (two seats)

Llanrhaeadr-yng-Nghinmeirch (one seat)

Prestatyn Central (two seats)

Prestatyn East (two seats)

Prestatyn Meliden (one seat)

Prestatyn North (three seats)

Prestatyn South West (two seats)

Rhuddlan (two seats)

Rhyl East (two seats)

Rhyl South (two seats)

Rhyl South East (three seats)

Rhyl South West (two seats)

Previous Labour councillors stood as Independents.

Rhyl West (two seats)

Ruthin (three seats)

St Asaph East (one seat)

St Asaph West (one seat)

Trefnant (one seat)

Tremeirchion (one seat)

(a) Election Centre/Andrew Teale source also compares the percentage vote of the lead candidate for each party in the ward

(b) Prestatyn North result corrected by election petition

* = sitting ward councillor prior to election

References

Denbighshire
2012